Pneumatopteris truncata, also known as the Christmas Island fern, is a species of terrestrial fern in the Thelypteridaceae family.

Description
The species grows as a large upright fern with 80–120 cm long fronds.

Distribution and habitat
The species is found in various sites in Asia, including India, southern China and Indochina. It also occurs on Christmas Island, an Australian territory in the eastern Indian Ocean, where it inhabits permanently moist sites in deep shade. The extremely small Christmas Island population has been listed as Critically Endangered under Australia's EPBC Act.

References

 
truncata
Ferns of Asia
Flora of Christmas Island
Ferns of Australia
Taxa named by Jean Louis Marie Poiret
Plants described in 1804